Liberty Hill is an unincorporated community in Talladega County, Alabama, United States, located  east of Sylacauga.

References

Unincorporated communities in Talladega County, Alabama
Unincorporated communities in Alabama